The Assistant Secretary for Health’s Exceptional Service Medal is an award of the US Public Health Service. Administered by the Assistant Secretary for Health, the medal is awarded at the sole discretion of the Assistant Secretary for Health.

Criteria
The Assistant Secretary for Health's Exceptional Service Medal is awarded at the sole discretion of an Assistant Secretary of Health who serves as a member of the United States Public Health Service Commissioned Corps to a member of any Uniformed Services of the United States. This award is administered by the Office of the Assistant Secretary for Health. As the award is bestowed at the discretion of an ASH who serves in uniform, there is no nomination procedure.

References 

Awards and decorations of the United States Public Health Service